The Laytons is an American sitcom that was broadcast on the now defunct DuMont Television Network, from August to October 1948. The series starred Amanda Randolph, who became the first African-American performer in a regular role on a U.S. network TV series.  It co-starred Vera Tatum and Broadway actress Elizabeth Brew.

Overview
According to The Complete Directory to Prime Time Network and Cable TV Shows 1946–Present by Tim Brooks and Earle Marsh, "little is known about the content of this early series". The 30-minute program, produced and distributed by DuMont, aired on Wednesdays at 8pm (ET) on DuMont's affiliate stations. The program had been seen locally on DuMont's New York flagship station WABD, beginning in May/June 1948.

According to Donald Bogle, the series made such a small impression that few remember The Laytons. However, the program paved the way for later TV shows starring or featuring black actors. The final episode of the program aired on October 13, 1948. Later in 1948, Randolph appeared again on DuMont, on a daytime series titled Amanda.

Episode status
As with most DuMont series, no recorded episodes of The Laytons are known to still exist.

See also
List of programs broadcast by the DuMont Television Network
List of surviving DuMont Television Network broadcasts
1948-49 United States network television schedule

References

Bibliography
David Weinstein, The Forgotten Network: DuMont and the Birth of American Television (Philadelphia: Temple University Press, 2004) 
Alex McNeil, Total Television, Fourth edition (New York: Penguin Books, 1980) 
Tim Brooks and Earle Marsh, The Complete Directory to Prime Time Network TV Shows, Third edition (New York: Ballantine Books, 1964)

External links

DuMont historical website

1948 American television series debuts
1948 American television series endings
1940s American sitcoms
American black sitcoms
Black-and-white American television shows
DuMont Television Network original programming
Lost television shows